Hatanaka (written:  or ) is a Japanese surname. Notable people with the surname include:

, Japanese ice hockey player
Bill Hatanaka (born 1954), Canadian football player
Gregory Hatanaka, American film director
, Japanese manga artist
, Japanese wheelchair racer
, Japanese military officer
, Japanese boxer
, Japanese footballer
, Japanese musician
, Japanese freestyle skier
, Japanese footballer
, Japanese astronomer
, Japanese actor and voice actor
, Japanese footballer
, Japanese cyclist

See also
4051 Hatanaka, a main-belt asteroid
Hatanaka (crater), a lunar crater

Japanese-language surnames